First League of Posavina Canton is a fourth level league in the Bosnia and Herzegovina football league system. The league champion is promoted to the Second League of the Federation of Bosnia and Herzegovina - North.

Member clubs
List of clubs competing in 2020–21 season: 

 NK 19 Srpanj
 NK Bok
 HNK Dragovoljac Novo Selo
 NK Frankopan
 NK Hajduk Orašje
 HNK Kostrč
 NK Mladi Zadrugar
 HNK Mladost Domaljevac
 HNK Mladost Donji Svilaj
 FK Mladost Sibovac
 NK Napredak Matići
 NK Sloga Prud
 NK Sloga Tolisa
 NK Vitanovići 78

References

4
Bos